Papyrus 25 (in the Gregory-Aland numbering), designated by 𝔓25, is an early copy of the New Testament in Greek. It is a papyrus manuscript of the Gospel of Matthew, it contains only Matthew 18:32-34; 19:1-3.5-7.9-10. 
The manuscript paleographically had been assigned to the early 4th century.

The Greek text of this codex is unclassifiable because of the Diatessaric character of text (like Dura Parchment 24 (Uncial 0212). Aland did not place it in any of Categories of New Testament manuscripts.

It is currently housed at the Staatliche Museen zu Berlin (Inv. no. 16388) in Berlin.

See also 

 List of New Testament papyri
 Matthew 18, 19

References

Further reading 

 Otto Stegmüller, Ein Bruchstück aus dem griechischen Diatessaron, ZNW 37 (1938), pp. 223–229.

External links 

 P25 images at the Center for the Study of New Testament Manuscripts

New Testament papyri
4th-century biblical manuscripts
Papyri of the Berlin State Museums
Gospel of Matthew papyri